The Border Union Railway was a railway line which connected places in the south of Scotland and Cumberland in England. It was authorised on 21 July 1859 and advertised as the Waverley Route by the promoters - the North British Railway.

History 
The first section of the route was opened between Carlisle and Scotch Dyke on 12 October 1861, to Newcastleton on 1 March 1862, Riccarton Junction on 2 June 1862 and throughout on 24 June 1862.  The railway was built as a double-track main line throughout.

Connections to other lines 
 Edinburgh and Hawick Railway at 
 Border Counties Railway at 
 Caledonian Railway Main Line at Gretna
 Maryport and Carlisle Railway, Newcastle and Carlisle Railway, Midland Railway Settle and Carlisle Line and Lancaster and Carlisle Railway at Carlisle Citadel

Current operations 
The line was closed to all traffic by British Railways on 5 January 1969. The line was dismantled in 1971.

The Waverley Route Heritage Association have preserved a part of the former route at Whitrope and are working on reopening the section from its base at Whitrope itself down into Riccarton Junction as a heritage railway.

References

Notes

Sources
 
 
 

 
Closed railway lines in Scotland
Closed railway lines in North West England
Transport in the Scottish Borders
Rail transport in Cumbria
Transport in Dumfries and Galloway
Railway companies established in 1859
Railway lines opened in 1862
Railway companies disestablished in 1922
1859 establishments in England 
British companies established in 1859
British companies disestablished in 1922